Dried cranberries are made by partially dehydrating fresh cranberries, a process similar to making grapes into raisins. They are used in trail mix, salads, breads, with cereals, or eaten on their own. Dried cranberries may be marketed as craisins due to the similarity in appearance with raisins, although the word "Craisin" is a registered trademark of Ocean Spray. Craisins were introduced as part of a packaged cereal produced by Ralston Purina in 1989.

Most commercially produced dried cranberries contain added sugar, and may be coated with vegetable oil to inhibit stickiness.

Nutrition

The nutrient content of dried cranberries may vary depending on the extent of dehydration, amount of sugar added during processing, and brand. According to an analysis by the US Department of Agriculture, dried cranberries are 16% water, 83% carbohydrates, 1% fat, and contain no protein.

A 100 g reference amount of dried cranberries supplies 308 calories, with a moderate content of vitamin E (14% of the Daily Value), and otherwise a low or absent content of micronutrients (table).

Uses
Dried cranberries can be added for color and flavor to various foods, including salads, oatmeal, cookies, muffins, loaves, breads and trail mix. They may be used to replace raisins or any dried fruit. Dried cranberries may be prepared with flavorings or coverings, such as chocolate.

Controversy
In 1989 after spending "millions of dollars" on raisin advertising, the California Raisin Advisory Board decried the similar name "Craisin", claiming that dried cranberries were "just the skin of the cranberry, sugar infused, and it's very tart."

See also

 List of dried foods

References

Dried fruit
Cranberries